Charles Cread Baldwin (born April 7, 1947) is a former Chief of Chaplains of the United States Air Force.

Biography
A native of New Haven, Connecticut, Baldwin is an ordained Southern Baptist pastor. He is a graduate of the Southern Baptist Theological Seminary. Baldwin is married to Anne, with whom he has three children and nine grandchildren.  Baldwin was the first, and to date the only Air Force Chief of Chaplains who had been a rated air force pilot.

Career
Baldwin graduated from United States Air Force Academy in 1969. He would go on to serve in the Vietnam War and the Gulf War. Baldwin served as an Air Force pilot before attending seminary and changing career fields to chaplain. He flew the EC-121 Warning Star, then later, the HH-53 "Super Jolly" as a rescue helicopter pilot.  Other assignments he held include serving at Headquarters, United States Air Forces in Europe and North American Aerospace Defense Command. Baldwin served as Deputy Chief of Chaplains of the United States Air Force from 2001 to 2004, when he became Chief of Chaplains with the rank of major general. His retirement was effective as of July 1, 2008.

Awards and military decorations

References

1947 births
Living people
Military personnel from New Haven, Connecticut
United States Air Force generals
Chiefs of Chaplains of the United States Air Force
Southern Baptist ministers
Recipients of the Legion of Merit
Recipients of the Air Force Distinguished Service Medal
Recipients of the Distinguished Flying Cross (United States)
Recipients of the Meritorious Service Medal (United States)
Recipients of the Air Medal
United States Air Force personnel of the Vietnam War
United States Air Force personnel of the Gulf War
United States Air Force Academy alumni
Southern Baptist Theological Seminary alumni
Vietnam War chaplains
Gulf War chaplains
Deputy Chiefs of Chaplains of the United States Air Force
20th-century American clergy